Hockeyclub 's-Hertogenbosch, also known as Den Bosch, is a Dutch field hockey club based in 's-Hertogenbosch, North Brabant. It was founded on 14 July 1937.

The first teams (men and women) both compete on the highest level of the Dutch field hockey league, the Hoofdklasse. HC 's-Hertogenbosch won the title in 1998 and 2001. The women's team reign since 1998, winning a record number of nineteen titles in 21 years since then.

Honours

Men
Hoofdklasse
Winners (2): 1997–98, 2000–01
 Runners-up (2): 1996–97, 1999–2000
Gold Cup
 Runners-up (1): 2017–18
EuroHockey Club Champions Cup
 Winners (1): 1999
 Runners-up (1): 2002
EuroHockey Cup Winners' Cup
 Winners (2): 1998, 2001
Hoofdklasse Indoor
 Winners (1): 1969–70

Women
Hoofdklasse
 Winners (21): 1997–98, 1998–99, 1999–2000, 2000–01, 2001–02, 2002–03, 2003–04, 2004–05, 2005–06, 2006–07, 2007–08, 2009–10, 2010–11, 2011–12, 2013–14, 2014–15, 2015–16, 2016–17, 2017–18, 2020–21, 2021–22
 Runners-up (3): 2008–09, 2012–13, 2018–19
Euro Hockey League
Winners (1): 2021
Runners-up (1): 2022
Gold Cup
 Winners (1): 2021–22
EuroHockey Club Cup
 Winners (16): 2000, 2001, 2002, 2003, 2004, 2005, 2006, 2007, 2008, 2009, 2010, 2011, 2013, 2016, 2017, 2018
 Runners-up (4): 1999, 2012, 2014, 2015
Hoofdklasse Indoor
 Winners (9): 1969–70, 1970–71, 1972–73, 1973–74, 1991–92, 2001–02, 2011–12, 2013–14, 2021–22
EuroHockey Indoor Club Cup
 Winners (1): 2013

Players

Current squad

Men's squad
Head coach: Marc Lammers

Women's Squad
Head coach: Marieke Dijkstra

Notable players

Men's internationals

 Nicolás Della Torre
 Pedro Ibarra
 Joaquín Menini
 Lucas Vila

 Kieran Govers
 Dylan Wotherspoon

 Sébastien Dockier
 Loic Van Doren
/
 Mark Gleghorne

 Michael Darling
 Mark Gleghorne
 Alan Sothern

 Hayden Shaw

 Francisco Cortés Juncosa
 Rodrigo Garza

 Austin Smith

Women's internationals

/
 Helen Richardson-Walsh

 Subhadra Pradhan

References

 
Dutch field hockey clubs
Field hockey clubs established in 1937
1937 establishments in the Netherlands
Sports clubs in 's-Hertogenbosch